Edward Shaw may refer to:
 Ed Shaw (activist) (1923–1995), American socialist
 Edward Shaw (bishop) (1860–1937), Bishop of Buckingham (1914–1921) and first class cricketer
 Edward Shaw (politician), New Zealand politician representing the Inangahua electorate, 1883–1884
 Edward Shaw (cricketer, born 1892) (1892–1916), English cricketer and British Army officer
 Edward Richard Shaw (1855–1903), professor and dean, New York University
 Edward S. Shaw (1853–1919), civil engineer
 Eddie Shaw (1937–2018), saxophonist
 Edward Shaw (footballer) (1864–?), Welsh footballer

See also
 Ed Shaw (disambiguation)
 Edward Shore (disambiguation)